Spresiano is a comune (municipality) in the Province of Treviso in the Italian region Veneto, located about  north of Venice and about  north of Treviso.

The municipality of Spresiano contains the frazioni (subdivisions, mainly villages and hamlets) Spresiano, Lovadina and Visnadello.

Spresiano borders the following municipalities: Arcade, Carbonera, Cimadolmo, Mareno di Piave, Maserada sul Piave, Nervesa della Battaglia, Santa Lucia di Piave, Susegana, Villorba.

Demographic evolution

References

External links
 www.comune.spresiano.tv.it
 www.parrocchiadispresiano.it

Cities and towns in Veneto